Eucalyptus gardneri, commonly known as blue mallet, or woacal, is a species of mallet with flower buds in groups of between seven and eleven, creamy yellow or pale lemon-coloured flowers and cylindrical to barrel-shaped fruit.

Description
Eucalyptus gardneri is a mallet that typically grows to a height of  but does not form a lignotuber. It has smooth grey to salmon-pink bark that is shed in short flakes. Flowering occurs from February to September or December and the flowers are creamy yellow or pale lemon-coloured.

Taxonomy and naming
Eucalyptus gardneri was first formally described by the botanist Joseph Maiden in 1924 in his book A Critical Revision of the Genus Eucalyptus.
The species is named in honour of Charles Austin Gardner who collected the type specimen in 1922 from near Bendering along the railway line that runs between Narrogin and Narembeen. Noongar people know the species as woacal.

In 1991, Ian Brooker and Stephen Hopper described two subspecies and the names have been accepted by the Australian Plant Census:
Eucalyptus gardneri Maiden subsp. gardneri;

Distribution and habitat
Blue mallet is found on breakaways, rocky ridges and slopes in the southern Wheatbelt region of Western Australia where it grows in gravelly lateritic soils.

Eucalyptus gardneri commonly occurs with E. argyphea E. phaenophylla in woodland communities making up the overstorey. Associated species in the understorey include Melaleuca uncinata, Hakea multilineata, Phebalium tuberculosum, Allocasuarina acutivalvis, Beyeria brevifolia and Trymalium elachophyllum.

Conservation status
Both subspecies of E. gardneri are classified as "not threatened" by the Western Australian Government Department of Parks and Wildlife.

Cultivation
The tree is sold commercially in seed form or as tube stock for use as an ornamental or shade tree in gardens or for erosion control or in water logged areas. It will grow in full sun, is drought tolerant and attracts birds.

See also
List of Eucalyptus species

References

gardneri
Myrtales of Australia
Eucalypts of Western Australia
Plants described in 1924
Taxa named by Joseph Maiden